Badhu Biday (lit. Farewell of the Bride) is a 1978 Bangladeshi drama film starring Kabari, Bulbul Ahmed and Shabana opposite him. Bulbul garnered Bangladesh National Film Award for Best Actor for his performance in the film.

Cast 
 Shabana as Chaya
 Kabari as Maya
 Bulbul Ahmed as Sagor
 Rawshan Jamil as Sagor's mother
 Tele Samad as Ashiq
 Abul Hayat as Master Moshai
 Sultana
 Nazmul Huda Bachchu 
 ATM Shamsuzzaman

Track listing 
"Ekush Khani Dekho" - Sabina Yasmin
"Ektu Phire Dekho" - Runa Laila (Debu Bhattacharya)
"O Akash O Nodi" - Sabina Yasmin

Awards 
Bangladesh National Film Awards
Best Actor - Bulbul Ahmed

References

1978 films
Bengali-language Bangladeshi films
Films scored by Alauddin Ali
Films scored by Debu Bhattacharya
1970s Bengali-language films